Geloptera is a genus of leaf beetles in the subfamily Eumolpinae. It is known from Australia.

Species

 Geloptera albertisii Jacoby, 1884
 Geloptera angulicollis Lea, 1915
 Geloptera apicilata Lea, 1922
 Geloptera apiciventris Lea, 1922
 Geloptera armiventris Lea, 1915
 Geloptera basiventris Lea, 1915
 Geloptera bidentimedia Lea, 1915
 Geloptera coatesi Lea, 1915
 Geloptera composita Lea, 1915
 Geloptera concinna Lea, 1915
 Geloptera duboulayi Clark, 1865
 Geloptera eluta Lea, 1915
 Geloptera femoralis (Jacoby, 1884)
 Geloptera hardcastlei Lea, 1915
 Geloptera igneonitens Baly, 1878
 Geloptera illidgei Lea, 1915
 Geloptera inaequalis Lea, 1915
 Geloptera intercoxalis Lea, 1915
 Geloptera jugularis (Erichson, 1842)
 Geloptera latericollis Lea, 1915
 Geloptera lateridens Lea, 1915
 Geloptera mediofusca Lea, 1915
 Geloptera microcalla Lea, 1915
 Geloptera minima Lea, 1915
 Geloptera miracula Lea, 1915
 Geloptera nodosa Clark, 1865
 Geloptera orientalis Lea, 1915
 Geloptera pallipes Lea, 1915
 Geloptera parvonitens Lea, 1925
 Geloptera porosa Lea, 1915
 Geloptera punctatissima Lea, 1915
 Geloptera rhaebocnema Lea, 1915
 Geloptera scitula Lea, 1915
 Geloptera semistriata Lea, 1915
 Geloptera setifera Lea, 1915
 Geloptera soror Lea, 1922
 Geloptera striatipennis Lea, 1915
 Geloptera tetraspilota Lea, 1915
 Geloptera tibialis Lea, 1915
 Geloptera tuberculata Baly, 1861
 Geloptera tuberculiventris Lea, 1915
 Geloptera uncinata Lea, 1915
 Geloptera viridimarginata Lea, 1922

References

External links
 Genus Geloptera Baly, 1861 at Australian Faunal Directory

Eumolpinae
Chrysomelidae genera
Beetles of Australia
Taxa named by Joseph Sugar Baly